Alan Mills may refer to:

Alan Mills (baseball) (born 1966), major league baseball pitcher
Alan Mills (musician) (1913–1977), Canadian folksinger, writer and actor
Alan Mills (tennis) (born 1935), tennis referee
Alan Mills (poet) (born 1979), Guatemalan poet and writer
Alan Mills, a character in EastEnders
Alan Mills, a member of Coast to Coast

See also
Allan Mills, Ontario